The Chinese Bungalow may refer to:

 The Chinese Bungalow (play)
 The Chinese Bungalow (1926 film)
 The Chinese Bungalow (1930 film)
 The Chinese Bungalow (1940 film)